Metacantharis is a genus of soldier beetle belonging to the family Cantharidae.

List of species
Species within this genus include:
 Metacantharis araxicola  (Reitter, 1891) 
 Metacantharis balcanograeca  Wittmer, 1969 
 Metacantharis clypeata  (Illiger, 1798) 
 Metacantharis discoidea  (Ahrens, 1812) 
 Metacantharis keiseri  Wittmer, 1969 
 Metacantharis peloponessica  Wittmer, 1974 
 Metacantharis picciolii  (Ragusa, 1870) 
 Metacantharis rosinae  (Pic, 1902) 
 Metacantharis taurigrada  Bourgeois, 1900 
 Metacantharis turcica  (Marseul, 1864) 
 Metacantharis walteri  Švihla, 1999

References

Beetles of Europe
Cantharidae